Andrew Kennaway Henderson (25 May 1879 – 17 January 1960) was a New Zealand clerk, illustrator, cartoonist, editor and pacifist. He was born in London,  England. He was imprisoned twice as a conscientious objector in World War I and drew numerous cartoons from a socialist point of view.

He edited and published the left-wing literary magazine Tomorrow in Christchurch, New Zealand from 1934 to 1940.

References

1879 births
1960 deaths
New Zealand cartoonists
New Zealand pacifists
New Zealand conscientious objectors
English emigrants to New Zealand
20th-century New Zealand writers
20th-century New Zealand artists
20th-century New Zealand male artists